Ohlone College  (Ohlone or OC) is a public community college with its main campus in Fremont, California and a second campus in Newark. It is part of the California Community College System. The Ohlone Community College District serves the cities of Fremont and Newark, as well as parts of Union City.

Ohlone offers 61 associate degrees leading to university transfer or careers and over 100 vocational certificate programs that provide job skill training.

History
Established as a California Community College in 1965 following voter approval, Ohlone College serves the cities of Fremont and Newark and parts of Union City in the southeast region of the San Francisco Bay area. The Ohlone Community College District is a single college district with two campuses and an e-campus.

Officially named Ohlone College on June 18, 1967, the institution's name honors the Ohlone people, whose unceded lands include the Fremont and Newark area that the school was founded, as well as much of the surrounding San Francisco Bay area, that the Ohlone people stewarded for hundreds of years prior to the arrival of Europeans.

A board of trustees was elected in 1966, which then hired the founding president, Dr. Stephen Epler, in June 1966.  The college opened in fall 1967 at the Serra Center, a temporary site on Washington Boulevard. Eventually the college went out to the community for a $10 million bond and in 1972 began construction of the new Ohlone College campus on Mission Boulevard in Fremont.

Ernest J. Kump designed the original nine buildings that make up the academic village. Buildings added later to the campus include the performing arts center, the technology center, the child development center and the student services center. A second campus was constructed in Newark, California, The Ohlone College Newark Center for Health Sciences and Technology, which opened in 2008.

Including Dr. Epler, Ohlone has had only seven presidents in its 45+ year history. In 2020, Dr. Eric Bishop was selected to be the school's seventh president.

Athletics
Ohlone fields teams in seven varsity sports (six men's, seven women's) including tennis, swimming, baseball, basketball, soccer and water polo, and is a member of the CCCAA (California Community College Athletics Association) and the Coast Conference.

Academics
Ohlone offers associate degrees in the Arts and Sciences (AA and AS) equivalent to completing the two year undergraduate coursework in many subjects. Ohlone also offers job training programs which can be completed in less than the two-year cycle required and 60 units for a degree.

Center for Deaf Studies
In 1972, the Ohlone College Center for Deaf Studies and Special Services was established when the college opened its doors to 30 deaf and hard of hearing students. The Center for Deaf Studies has up to 200 Deaf and Hard of Hearing students in a single year.

Biotechnology high school outreach programs
Learning Alliance for Bioscience (LAB) Program is a National Science Foundation funded program that places high school students from underrepresented populations on an academic pathway to prepare for college degrees in biotechnology.

Broadcasting department
Radio: KOHL 89.3 FM. 
Film & television: ONTV 28, broadcast on Comcast and streamed online.

The Broadcasting Dept: Film & Television offers classes in beginning and advanced short film & video production, television news, documentary production, video editing, writing for media and shooting digital video. ONTV produces a live newscast on Wednesday nights at 8:30 pm during the spring and fall semesters.
Notable graduates include Betty Yu (KPIX-TV reporter), Azemith Smith (KTVU reporter), Tommy Tran (Anchor for CBS Sports), Tiffany Liou (WFAA reporter), Rebecca Strom (KRON-TV), and casting director Erin Tomasello, as well as dozens of producers, reporters, directors and filmmakers working in film, television and the Internet.

KOHL radio has been the host of notable individuals such as civil rights activist Bobby Seale and actress Rita Moreno.

Registered Nursing Department
Ohlone College offers an Associate of Science Degree in Nursing accredited by the National League for Nursing Accrediting Commission and the California Board of Registered Nurses. Students who graduate from this program are eligible to sit for the NCLEX-RN which leads to licensure as a registered nurse (RN).

Physical Therapist Assistant (PTA) Department
Ohlone College's Physical Therapist Assistant (PTA) program is a two calendar year course of study leading to an Associate of Science Degree and eligibility to take the National PTA licensing examination.

Ohlone College's PTA program is accredited by the Commission on Accreditation in Physical Therapy Education of the American Physical Therapy Association.

Respiratory Therapist (RT) Department
The Respiratory Therapist is a licensed healthcare professional in cardio-pulmonary evaluation, diagnosis and treatment.

Upon completion of Respiratory Therapist program graduates are eligible to sit for the California State License Examination for Respiratory Care Practitioner (RCP). Once the RCP Credential has been attained graduates are eligible to sit for the Advanced Level Practitioner Examinations (RRT) of the National Board for Respiratory Care.

Notable alumni

 Glenn Dishman (born 1970), baseball pitcher and pitching coach
 Brian Dunning (born 1965), author
 Dina Ruiz Eastwood (born 1965, television personality, Salinas-Monterey news anchor)
 Larry Johannessen (1947–2009), author
 Tiffany Liou, journalist
 Kenney Mencher (born 1965), painter
 Anjuli Papineau, soccer player and soul singer
 Gary Plummer (born 1960), American footballer

Notable faculty

 Lev Kirshner (born 1969), soccer player and coach

References

External links
Official website

California Community Colleges
Universities and colleges in Alameda County, California
Educational institutions established in 1965
Education in Fremont, California
Schools accredited by the Western Association of Schools and Colleges
Newark, California
1965 establishments in California